This article shows past squads from the Puerto Rican professional volleyball team Pinkin de Corozal from the Liga de Voleibol Superior Femenino.

2011
As of February 2011
 Position: Lost in quarterfinals
 Head Coach:  Luis E. Ruiz
 Assistant coach:  Jorge Pérez Vento

2010
 Awards: League Championship
 Head Coach:  Luis E. Ruiz
 Assistant coach:  Jorge Pérez Vento

Release or Transfer

2009
 Awards: League Runner-Up.
 Head Coach:  Luis E. Ruiz
 Assistant coach:  Yarelis Rodríguez

Release or Transfer

2008
 Awards: League Championship.
 Head Coach:  Luis E. Ruiz
 Assistant coach:  Yarelis Rodríguez

2007
 Position: Lost in Semifinals
 Head Coach:  Luis E. Ruiz
 Assistant coach:  Steven Fenosic

References

External links
 Pinkin Official Site

Puerto Rican women's volleyball club squads